A Portrait of Duke Ellington is an album featuring trumpeter Dizzy Gillespie and orchestra performing compositions associated with Duke Ellington, recorded in 1960 and released on the Verve label. All of the orchestral arrangements were provided by then Hi-Lo's accompanist – and sometimes arranger – Clare Fischer, hired on the basis of a previously recorded but unreleased album with strings, arranged by Fischer for erstwhile University of Michigan classmate Donald Byrd. Byrd played the tape for Gillespie; Gillespie liked what he heard. Unfortunately for Fischer, especially in light of the critical accolades given the eventual fruit of his, and Gillespie's, labor, Fischer's name was nowhere to be found on the finished LP; widespread awareness of his participation would have to await the CD reissue almost 2½ decades later.

Reception

The AllMusic review awarded the album 4.5 stars. The album's original LP release received 5 stars from Billboard, though, owing to Verve's aforementioned oversight, Fischer's contribution went unnoticed. In fact, it was only through the efforts of The Washington Post'''s Tony Gieske that this, as well as two of Fischer's other groundbreaking efforts in this period, were acknowledged and documented. Regarding the Gillespie LP, Gieske noted:
And on A Portrait of Duke Ellington (Verve MG V 8386), that depth and skill, stimulated by a change in the stale Gillespie repertoire and compemented by rich, radically imaginative arrangements by, I am told, Clare Fischer, result in a really classic album. Fischer, a young conservatory graduate, is a new name to be reckoned with.

Track listingAll compositions by Duke Ellington except as indicated''
 "In a Mellow Tone" - 3:47 
 "Things Ain't What They Used to Be" (Mercer Ellington) - 4:54 
 "Serenade to Sweden" - 4:24 
 "Chelsea Bridge" (Billy Strayhorn) - 2:36 
 "Upper Manhattan Medical Group" (Strayhorn) - 3:06 
 "Do Nothin' Till You Hear from Me" - 2:40 
 "Caravan" (Juan Tizol, Ellington) - 5:23 
 "Sophisticated Lady" - 3:21 
 "Johnny Come Lately" - 3:38 
 "Perdido" (Tizol) - 4:51 
 "Come Sunday" - 2:58

Personnel
Dizzy Gillespie - trumpet
Bennie Green - trombone
Ray Alonge, Richard Berg, Joe Singer - French horn
Jay McAllister - tuba 
Robert DiDomenica - flute
Ernest Bright, John Murtaugh, Paul Richie, Stan Webb - woodwinds
George Devens - vibraphone
Hank Jones - piano, celesta
George Duvivier - bass
Charlie Persip - drums
Clare Fischer - arranger, director

Notes

References 

1960 albums
Albums arranged by Clare Fischer
Dizzy Gillespie albums
Duke Ellington tribute albums
Verve Records albums